Boutteville may refer to:

Boutteville, a commune in the Manche department in Normandy in northwestern France
Bouteville, a commune in the Charente department in southwestern France
César Boutteville (1917–2015), French–Vietnamese chess master

See also
Le Barc de Boutteville, an art gallery in Paris
Bouteville (disambiguation)